Chesterfield Kings may refer to:
Chesterfield Kings (cigarette), an American brand of unfiltered cigarette made by Chesterfield (cigarette)
The Chesterfield Kings, an American rock band